In organic chemistry, a diethynylbenzene dianion is an anion consisting of two ethynyl anions as substituents on a benzene ring. With the chemical formula , three positional isomers are possible, differing in the relative positions of the two substituents around the ring:
ortho-diethynylbenzene dianion
meta-diethynylbenzene dianion
para-diethynylbenzene dianion
The gaseous state of all three anions are of theoretical interest. They have been generated by decarboxylation of benzene dipropynoic acids, using the technique of mass spectrometry. The meta isomer is the second-strongest, and the para isomer is the third-strongest.

Observation 
These dianions were generated in a linear quadrupole ion-trap mass spectrometer. Electrospray ionization (ESI) of the diacid precursor results in the dicarboxylate dianion [C6H4(C3O2)2]2− by loss of two hydrogen atoms, identified spectrometrically by its mass-to-charge ratio (m/z) of 106. This dianion was mass-selected and then subjected to collision-induced dissociation (CID), resulting in the consecutive loss of two carbon dioxide molecules to form the diethynyl dianion [C6H4(C2)2]2− at m/z = 62. For the ortho isomer, the reaction process is as follows, with the other isomers following an analogous process depending on the isomer of the original diacid:

Reactions 
Reactions of the gas-phase dianions were studied by reacting with a small quantity of various reagents added to the helium carrier gas in the spectrometer. For example, reaction with deuterium oxide (heavy water) produced the singly-deuterated monoanion C6H4(C2D)() identified as m/z = 126. Reaction with benzene produced the phenyl anion (m/z = 77) highlighting the extreme basicity of the dianion. Attempted reaction with deuterium gas and deuterated methane was not successful despite the favourable thermodynamics; the authors attribute this to the high activation barrier for proton abstraction from those substrates.

Basicity 
All three isomers are superbasic. The meta isomer is the second-strongest, and the para isomer is the third. All three are readily able to accept any proton to its ethynyl tails, from almost any compound. All three isomers function as superbases better than helonium does as a superacid.

See also
 Lithium monoxide anion

References

Acetylides
Anions
Benzene derivatives
Superbases